Tratt. can refer to:

 trattenuto
 Leopold Trattinnick